Galaxy Express (Hangul: 갤럭시 익스프레스) is a garage rock band from South Korea that formed in 2006. The trio, which is known for its energetic stage presence, is one of the most popular rock bands in South Korea and has received international acclaim.

Career 
Galaxy Express debuted in 2007 with the EP, To The Galaxy. Their first full-length album, 2008's Noise On Fire, won Best Rock Album at the 2009 Korean Music Awards.

To make their second full-length album, 2010's Wild Days, the band posted songs online and asked fans for feedback before recording final versions. The entire process of writing and recording the album took less than one month. This experiment helped Galaxy Express win the award for Musician of the Year at the 2011 Korean Music Awards.

In 2011, Galaxy Express took part in the Seoulsonic tour of North America, performing at major music festivals Canadian Music Week and South by Southwest, and at concerts in New York and Los Angeles. Their travels were documented in the 2012 documentary Turn It Up to 11, Part 2: Wild Days.

Galaxy Express returned to the Canadian Music Festival in 2012 and South by Southwest in 2012, 2013, and 2017. The band has also performed in France, Taiwan, and Hong Kong.

In 2013, band member Lee Ju-hyun was arrested in South Korea for marijuana possession, cultivation, and smoking. At the time, Galaxy Express was participating in the Mnet competition show Band Generation, and had advanced to the final round. While the band won the competition, Mnet did not air the final episode. Several days after Lee's arrest, band member Park Jong-hyun was investigated for smoking marijuana.

The band released their third album, Galaxy Express, in 2012 and their fourth album, Walking on Empty, in 2015.

Band members
 Lee Ju-hyun: bass, vocals
 Park Jong-hyun: guitar, vocals
 Kim Hee-kwon: drums

Discography

 To the Galaxy EP (2007)
 Ramble Around EP (2007)
 Noise on Fire (2008)
 Come On & Get Up! EP (2009)
 Wild Days (2010)
 Naughty Boy split with Crying Nut (2011)
 Galaxy Express (2012)
 Walking on Empty (2015)
 Electric Jungle (2018)
 Thonig And Bell (2022)

Awards

Korean Music Awards

References

External links
 Official Website

South Korean indie rock groups
South Korean punk rock groups
Musical groups established in 2006
South Korean rock music groups